In ancient Canaanite religion, Ba'al Hermon (translated to Lord (Ba'al) of Hermon, meaning consecrated place) was the titular local deity of Mount Hermon. The mountain was inhabited by the Hivites.

References

West Semitic gods
Mount Hermon
Baal